Charles Downing (July 9, 1802 – January 18, 1885), was an American pomologist, horticulturist, and author.

Biography 
Charles Downing was born in Newburgh, New York, on July 9, 1802. 

He began helping his father, Samuel Downing, with his nursery business when he was a teen. In 1822, his father died and Downing took over the business, later partnering with his brother, Andrew Jackson Downing, in 1835. The partnership lasted until 1839 when Charles sold his interest to start his own business.

As a nurseryman, Downing was known for his cultivation skill and trustworthiness.

Published in 1845, he worked with his brother to write The Fruits and Fruit Trees of America. After Andrew's death in 1852, Downing edited and added new material and reissued The Fruits and Fruit Trees of America. Each new edition greatly enlarged the book and it was the best publication of the kind in the United States. 

In 1850, he left his nursery and began to research and experiment with fruit varieties. His test orchard contained 1,800 varieties of apples and 1,000 varieties of pears. He also worked with cultivating a variety of grapes in New York state.

He was regarded as one of the foremost pomologists of his day. He also wrote many articles upon horticultural subjects under the initials "C. D." His work throughout was conscientious and accurate, and he was internationally recognized as an authority upon pomology, horticulture, and tree growths. Quiet, modest, and retiring, although an active member of horticultural societies, he would never make a public speech.

In 1870, Downing traveled with Marshall P. Wilder, Patrick Barry, and George Ellwanger to California and published about their journey in Tilton's Journal. The California Farmer and Journal of Useful Sciences printed their report in seven articles. 

Their report transformed the horticultural landscape through the realization of the optimal growing conditions, vast acreage, large fruits, and exotic plants of California.

Death and legacy 
While in New York City in 1883, Downing was knocked down and run over by a horsecar. He never completely recovered from the injuries he received and died two years later on January 18, 1885. 

He was married to Mary Wait, daughter of Samuel Wait of Montgomery, New York.

Downing bequeathed his library of books and manuscripts to the Iowa Agricultural College Horticulture Department. His drawings and descriptions of apples and other fruits became a major source for the fruit sections of the 1903 American Horticultural Manual.

References

Sources

External links
 

1803 births
1885 deaths
19th-century American botanists
19th-century American journalists
19th-century American male writers
American garden writers
American horticulturists
 American male journalists
Journalists  from New York (state)
Pomologists
People from Newburgh, New York
 Scientists from New York (state)